A junior is a person in the third year at an educational institution; usually at a secondary school or at the college and university level, but also in other forms of post-secondary educational institutions. In United States high schools, a junior is equivalent to an eleventh grade student.  Juniors are considered upperclassmen.

Education in the United States

High school
In the United States the 11th grade is usually the third year of a student's high school period and is referred to as junior year. High school juniors are advised to prepare for college entrance exams (ACT or SAT) and to start narrowing down on colleges they want to go to.

College
In the U.S., colleges generally require students to declare an academic major by the beginning of their junior year. College juniors are advised to begin the internship process and preparing for additional education (medical school, law school, etc.) by completing applications and taking additional examinations.

See also

 Freshman
 Sophomore
 Senior

References

Educational stages
Educational years
Students in the United States